Polaroid Picture is an EP by Frank Turner released on February 3, 2014 via Xtra Mile. The title track was originally featured on Turner's fifth studio album Tape Deck Heart, and a music video was released on September 19, 2013. Turner covers three artists on this EP -- Frightened Rabbit's "The Modern Leper", Biffy Clyro's "Who's Got a Match?", which was also released on Turner's Losing Days (EP) and The Weakerthans' "Plea from a Cat Named Virtute." The EP also feature a newly released song called "Sweet Albion Blues."

Track listing

References

2014 EPs
Frank Turner albums